Dendrocalamus giganteus, commonly known as giant bamboo, is a giant tropical and subtropical, dense-clumping species native to Southeast Asia. It is one of the largest bamboo species in the world.

Description
A very tall, large-culmed, grayish-green bamboo, it grows in clumps consisting of a large number of closely growing culms, and typically reaches a height of 30 meters (98 feet), but one clump in Arunachal Pradesh, India reached a height of 42 meters. Under favorable conditions, it can grow up to 40 cm per day.  The record for the species, 18 inches (46 centimeters) in 24 hours, was set on July 29-30 of 1903 at Peradeniya Royal Botanical Gardens in Ceylon (Sri Lanka). In subtropical climates, it does not grow as tall, struggling to grow to 20 meters.

Culms are straight and grayish green with a powdery appearance, becoming brownish green on drying, with a smooth surface. Young shoots are blackish purple. Internode length is 25–40 cm, and diameter is 10–35 cm. Culm walls are thin, branching only at the top. Aerial roots occur up to the eighth node. The rootstock is stout.

The culm sheath is greenish when young, becoming dark brown when mature. Sheaths are large and broad, length of sheath proper 24–30 cm, and width is 40–60 cm. The blade is triangular, 7–10 cm long. The top of the sheath is rounded. Auricles are small, equal, and crisped. The upper surface of the sheath is covered with stiff, gold and brownish hairs. The under surface is glossy, and not hairy. Sheath fall off is early.

Distribution and habitat
Dendrocalamus giganteus is native to India, Myanmar, Thailand and China's Yunnan province. Its habitat is in forests and on river banks, from sea level to  altitude.

Uses
Dendrocalamus giganteus is used in construction and weaving. The shoots are edible.

References

giganteus
Flora of India (region)
Flora of Myanmar
Flora of Thailand
Flora of Yunnan